Granite Ventures is a venture capital firm with offices in San Francisco, California.  Granite's predecessor H&Q Venture Associates, founded in 1992, was the venture capital investment arm of Hambrecht & Quist, a leading technology oriented investment bank. Granite completed a spinout from H&Q when the bank was sold to Chase Manhattan Bank in 1999.

Since its founding, Granite has raised over $1 billion in investor commitments and has invested in more than 90 companies. In 2005, the firm raised Granite Ventures II, its second fund since completing its spinout in 2000, with $350 million of investor commitments.

Granite's investment professionals include:  Chris Hollenbeck, Chris McKay, Standish O'Grady and Eric Zimits.

Investments
Granite has backed such companies as Anaplan, Tumbleweed Communications, Plumtree Software, Sendmail, Workboard, and Westbridge Technology.

Its investments also include Airbnb, Aspen Avionics, HyTrust, Lucidworks, Survios, and Telltale Games.

References

External links

Venture capital firms of the United States
Companies based in San Francisco
Financial services companies established in 1992